Bazgir (also Romanized as Bāzgīr) is a village in Hemmatabad Rural District, in the Central District of Borujerd County, Lorestan Province, Iran. At the 2006 census, its population was 31, in 7 families.

References 

Towns and villages in Borujerd County